Castle Recording Laboratory (also referred to as Castle Studio, or The Castle) was a recording studio established in Nashville, Tennessee, in 1946 by WSM broadcast engineers Carl Jenkins, George Reynolds and Aaron Shelton. The Castle was Nashville's first commercial recording studio, producing close to half of the songs on the country music charts between 1947 and 1955.

History

Early history
In 1946, recognizing demand for local recording studio services in Nashville, WSM broadcast engineers Carl Jenkins, George Reynolds and Aaron Shelton established Castle Recording Laboratory (named after the radio station's nickname "Air Castle of the South").

Less than a year later, Castle Recording recorded Francis Craig and His Orchestra's Ryman Auditorium performance of "Near You" for Bullet Records, which became the first number one song recorded in Nashville and the number one song of 1947.

Tulane Hotel
The subsequent demand for Castle Recording's services was too much for its owners to accommodate in WSM's studios after hours, and in 1947, with a $1,000 loan from Third National Bank to convert a banquet room on the second floor of the Hotel Tulane at 206 8th Avenue North into a studio equipped with their mixing console, an Ampex Model 200 tape recorder, and a Scully lathe, establishing the first commercial recording space in Nashville. Castle cut master discs for all major labels (except RCA), and independent labels like Bullet Records. Castle Recording produced close to half of the songs on the country music charts between 1947 and 1955.

Castle Recording shut down in 1956 in light of WSM enacting new policies designed to limit employees' outside business interests, as well as the planned demolition of the Tulane Hotel. The studio's founders continued their WSM careers.

Notable artists
Hank Williams recorded his first demos at Castle Recording on December 11, 1946, and went on to record almost exclusively at Castle for his entire career.

Paul Cohen and Owen Bradley recorded artists like Ernest Tubb, Red Foley, Kitty Wells, and Webb Pierce at Castle Recording before Bradley went on to co-found Quonset Hut Studio.

References

1946 establishments in Tennessee
1956 disestablishments in Tennessee
Recording studios in Tennessee